The Wiesbaden Bismarck Tower was one of approximately 240 monuments built in honour of Otto von Bismarck between 1869 and 1934. The wooden tower was built in 1910 close to the former watch tower on the Height of Bierstadt. It was planned only as interim solution to be later replaced by a solid structure with a lift. However, this project did not materialise due to lack of funding. In 1916 the tower, nicknamed the "Eiffel Tower of Wiesbaden", was closed to visitors and used as military observation post. In 1918 it was demolished due to its poor state of repair.

See also 
 List of towers

References

External links 
 https://web.archive.org/web/20070927191359/http://www.bismarcktuerme.de/website/ebene4/hessen/wiesbad.html 

Buildings and structures in Wiesbaden
1910 establishments in Germany
1918 disestablishments in Germany
Bismarck towers
Tourist attractions in Wiesbaden